Life Vest Inside (LVI) is a 501(c)(3) non-profit grassroots organization based in New York City.

Life Vest Inside acts to prevent social issues such as bullying, depression, and substance abuse from village man by taking a proactive approach.

Founder 
Orly Wahba is an educator, entrepreneur, and community activist. In 2011, Wahba founded Life Vest Inside, with the goal to empower and unite through the power of kindness. Through Life Vest Inside, Wahba encourages people to embrace the incredible power of giving and recognize that in times of hardship, kindness, like a life vest, keeps the world afloat.

LVI gained international acclaim when Wahba's short film Kindness Boomerang went viral, reaching over 80 million people and counting; landing her a spot to speak at TED2013 on the magic of kindness.

Wahba frequently tours giving talk at schools, college campuses, companies and organizations that are interested in incorporating a culture of kindness in their establishments. She is represented by the MacMillan Speakers Bureau.

Wahba received her Bachelor's Degree from Brooklyn College in Film Production and English. She also received a Master's Degree in Jewish History from Touro College. In November 2012 Wahba was elected to the International Council of the World Kindness Movement. She is currently working on publishing her book, a Guide to Kindness, through MacMillan publishers.

Activities 
LVI has been featured on The Today Show, NBC, CBS, and other media outlets.

Film and Media 
In October 2011, Life Vest Inside posted a video called Kindness Boomerang. Shot all in one take, it shows a chain reaction of random kindness, as strangers are helped—and then help others—through a bustling cityscape. Kindness Boomerang was shot on September 1, 2010. 

Revolution of Love: released November 13, 2015, set to LVI's original song "Revolution of Love" in which a struggling musician utilizes his talents to help a homeless man find hope in a time of despair.

Dance for Kindness 
In 2012, Life Vest Inside initiated Dance For Kindness, a WorldWide event in celebration of World Kindness Day. Groups from across the globe join together to perform a Kindness Freezmob/Flashmob to the same song, same dance, all happening on the same day. The purpose of Dance for Kindness is to show that regardless of the differences in race, religion, ethnicity culture and background — the common thread that ties us together is kindness.

The Dance for Kindness flagship location is in the heart of NYC, Times Square.

In 2015, several Celebrity Ambassadors joined Life Vest Inside including:
 The Today Show's Hoda Kotb
 Peter Scolari
 Rachel Marie Thomas

Dance for Kindness Stats:
 2012: 15 Countries, 30 cities, 3,500 participants
 2013: 25 countries, 30 cities, 5,000 participants
 2014: 30 countries, 80 cities, 10,000 participants
 2015: 50 countries, 100 cities, 12,000+ participants

DFK Group Leaders:
Each city is run by LVI fans that sign up to become a Group Leader in their region. Group Leaders organize the events under the guidance and leadership of Life Vest Inside.

References 

Non-profit organizations based in New York City
501(c)(3) organizations